The name Giedymin may refer to

Gediminas (1275-1341), monarch of Lithuania
Jerzy Giedymin (1925-1993), the philosopher of science